Money Creek Township is located in McLean County, Illinois. As of the 2010 census, its population was 1,085 and it contained 511 housing units.

The township took its name from Money Creek.

Geography

Demographics

Notable people
The American frontiersman and preserver of the buffalo, Charles "Buffalo" Jones, was reared at Money Creek during the 1850s.

References

External links
City-data.com
Illinois State Archives

Townships in McLean County, Illinois
Townships in Illinois